Jewel is a 1915 American silent drama film directed by Phillips Smalley and starring Ella Hall, Rupert Julian and Frank Elliott.

Cast
 Ella Hall as Jewel 
 Rupert Julian as Mr. Evringham 
 Frank Elliott as Lawrence Evringham 
 Hylda Hollis as Mrs. Lawrence Evringham 
 Brownie Brownell as Eliose
 T.D. Crittenden as Harry Evringham 
 Dixie Carr as Julia 
 Gibson Gowland as Dr. Ballard 
 Abe Mundon as Zeke 
 Jack Holt as Nat Bonnell 
 Lule Warrenton as Mrs. Forbes

References

Bibliography
 Goble, Alan. The Complete Index to Literary Sources in Film. Walter de Gruyter, 1999.

External links
 

1915 films
1915 drama films
1910s English-language films
American silent feature films
Silent American drama films
Films directed by Phillips Smalley
American black-and-white films
Universal Pictures films
1910s American films